David Peter Kopacz (born 29 May 1999) is a professional footballer who plays as a midfielder for 3. Liga club FC Ingolstadt. Born in Germany, he has represented Poland at youth international levels.

Career
In the summer of 2018 Kopacz joined VfB Stuttgart on a four-year-deal. On 16 July 2019, he was loaned out to Górnik Zabrze until the end of the 2019–20 season. On 5 August 2019, Kopacz made his debut in the Ekstraklasa against Wisła Kraków.

On 31 July 2020, Kopacz moved to Würzburger Kickers.

On 16 May 2022, he joined FC Ingolstadt.

References

External links
 
 
 
 

1999 births
Living people
People from Iserlohn
Sportspeople from Arnsberg (region)
Footballers from North Rhine-Westphalia
Citizens of Poland through descent
German people of Polish descent
Polish footballers
Poland youth international footballers
Poland under-21 international footballers
German footballers
Association football midfielders
Ekstraklasa players
III liga players
Regionalliga players
3. Liga players
2. Bundesliga players
Borussia Dortmund players
VfB Stuttgart players
VfB Stuttgart II players
Górnik Zabrze players
Würzburger Kickers players
FC Ingolstadt 04 players